Quadraspidiotus is a genus of true bugs belonging to the family Diaspididae.

Species:
 Quadraspidiotus juglansregiae
 Quadraspidiotus gigas (Thiem & Gerneck, 1934)

References

Diaspididae